Daniel Bielica (born 30 April 1999) is a Polish professional footballer who plays as a goalkeeper for Ekstraklasa club Górnik Zabrze.

Club career
On 12 August 2020, he was loaned to Warta Poznań.

References

External links

1999 births
Sportspeople from Zabrze
Living people
Polish footballers
Association football goalkeepers
Górnik Zabrze players
Sandecja Nowy Sącz players
Warta Poznań players
Ekstraklasa players
I liga players
III liga players